Wolfgang Frey (born 14 August 1942 in Rechberghausen) is a German bryologist and phytogeographer.

In 2007, a Festschrift was published in honor of Frey.

References

Botanists with author abbreviations
1942 births
20th-century German botanists
Living people
People from Göppingen (district)